Cremnoconchus syhadrensis is a species of freshwater snail, an aquatic gastropod mollusk in the family Littorinidae, the winkles or periwinkles.

Cremnoconchus syhadrensis is the type species of the genus Cremnoconchus.

Distribution
This species occurs in Western Ghats, India.

Description

References

External links

Littorinidae
Gastropods described in 1863